is a taxonomic work by Giovanni Antonio Scopoli, published in Vienna in 1763. As well as describing hundreds of new species,  contained observations on the species' biology, including the first published account of queen bees mating outside the hive.

Classification
In contrast to his predecessors Carl Linnaeus and Johan Christian Fabricius, who had used the structure of the insect wing and the structure of the insect mouthparts, respectively, as the main means of classifying arthropods, Scopoli favoured a more holistic approach.

In , Scopoli described 1153 species of "insects" (a term which at that time included many arthropods), divided into seven orders:
Coleoptera (beetles and orthopteroid insects) – species 1–329
Proboscidea (= Hemiptera) – species 330–418
Lepidoptera – species 419–676
Neuroptera – species 677–712
Aculeata (= Hymenoptera) – species 713–838
Halterata (= Diptera) – species 839–1024
Pedestria (various wingless animals, including silverfish, fleas, mites, arachnids, crustaceans and myriapods) – species 1025–1153

Taxa
Nowadays, it is the western part of Slovenia.

For each species, Scopoli gave references to previously published illustrations and binomial names. They include:

15. Scarabæus eremita, now Osmoderma eremita
65. Curculio piger, now Cleonus piger
97. Curculio glaucus, now Phyllobius glaucus
112. Attelabus lilii, now Lilioceris lilii
124. Cantharis fulva, now Rhagonycha fulva
146. Cantharis nobilis, now Oedemera nobilis
199. Buprestis salicina, now Smaragdina salicina
264. Carabus catenulatus
408. Aphis fabae
428. Papilio fagi, now Hipparchia fagi
510. Phalaena fulminea, now Catocala fulminea
525. Phalaena rubiginosa, now Conistra rubiginosa
526. Phalaena clavipalpis, now Paradrina clavipalpis
527. Phalaena deceptoria, now Deltote deceptoria
532. Phalaena nebulata, now Euchoeca nebulata
535. Phalaena fimbrialis, now Thalera fimbrialis
537. Phalaena punctinalis, now Hypomecis punctinalis
540. Phalaena lineata, now Siona lineata
542. Phalaena exanthemata, now Cabera exanthemata
545. Phalaena ornata, now Scopula ornata
546. Phalaena sylvata, now Abraxas sylvata
549. Phalaena glaucata, now Cilix glaucata
551. Phalaena chlorosata, now Petrophora chlorosata
561. Phalaena moeniata, now Scotopteryx moeniata
565. Phalaena aurata, now Pyrausta aurata
567. Phalaena ochrata, now Idaea ochrata
571. Phalaena alpinata, now Glacies alpinata
572. Phalaena murinata, now Minoa murinata
575. Phalaena laevigata, now Idaea laevigata
576. Phalaena inquinata, now Idaea inquinata
577. Phalaena tenebrata, now Panemeria tenebrata
579. Phalaena despicata, now Pyrausta despicata
580. Phalaena nigrata, now Pyrausta nigrata
583. Phalaena podana, now Archips podana
591. Phalaena rufana, now Celypha rufana
595. Phalaena montana, now Macrophya montana
599. Phalaena formosana, now Enarmonia formosana
600. Phalaena rivulana, now Celypha rivulana
607. Phalaena anthracinalis, now Euplocamus anthracinalis
609. Phalaena citrinalis, now Hypercallia citrinalis
610. Phalaena trabealis, now Emmelia trabealis
612. Phalaena lunalis, now Zanclognatha lunalis
614. Phalaena extimalis, now Evergestis extimalis
615. Phalaena sericealis, now Rivula sericealis
616. Phalaena ruralis, now Pleuroptya ruralis
618. Phalaena nemoralis, now Agrotera nemoralis
620. Phalaena perlella, now Crambus perlella
627. Phalaena craterella, now Chrysocrambus craterellus
628. Phalaena chrysonuchella, now Thisanotia chrysonuchella
636. Phalaena palliatella, now Eilema palliatella
638. Phalaena forficella, now Harpella forficella
643. Phalaena mucronella, now Ypsolopha mucronella
649. Phalaena rufimitrella, now Cauchas rufimitrella
654. Phalaena scalella, now Pseudotelphusa scalella
660. Phalaena aruncella, now Micropterix aruncella
661. Phalaena alchimiella, now Caloptilia alchimiella
662. Phalaena aureatella, now Micropterix aureatella
673. Phalaena bipunctidactyla, now Stenoptilia bipunctidactyla
734. Tenthredo ribesii, now Nematus ribesii
819. Apis pascuorum, now Bombus pascuorum
833. Formica vaga, now Camponotus vagus
870. Musca maculata, now Graphomya maculata
876. Musca tuguriorum, now Phaonia tuguriorum
880. Musca angelicae, now Phaonia angelicae
954. Conops pertinax, now Eristalis pertinax
962. Conops cuprea, now Ferdinandea cuprea
967. Conops aeneus, now Eristalinus aeneus
1134. Oniscus muscorum, now Philoscia muscorum

Publication
 was published by Johann Thomas von Trattner in Vienna in 1763. Forty-three plates of illustrations were prepared for publication, but were never offered for sale, and few copies of  include the plates. They illustrate the species numbered 1–815, with the exception of the genus Aphis (species 396–410).

 was published long before the international standardisation of units; to help readers understand his measurements, Scopoli therefore included a printed scale of three Parisian inches, each divided into twelve lines.

References

Further reading

External links
Entomologia Carniolica, Internet Archive
Entomologia Carniolica, Google Books

1763 in science
1763 books
Environment of Slovenia
18th-century Latin books
History of science and technology in Slovenia
Beekeeping
18th century in Carniola